12 Monkeys is an American television series on Syfy created by Terry Matalas and Travis Fickett. It is a science fiction mystery drama based on the 1995 12 Monkeys film, written by David Peoples and Janet Peoples and directed by Terry Gilliam, which itself was based on Chris Marker's 1962 short film La Jetée. The series aired between January 16, 2015, and July 6, 2018.

Series overview

Episodes

Season 1 (2015)

Season 2 (2016)

Season 3 (2017)

Season 4 (2018)

Ratings

Notes

References

External links
 
 

Lists of American science fiction television series episodes